Yeongsan-myeon (also known as Yongsan) is a myeon of Changnyeong County, South Gyeongsang Province, in South Korea.

At Yeongsan the Battle of Yongsan was an engagement in the Korean War. It was part of the Battle of Pusan Perimeter and was one of several large engagements fought simultaneously.

History

See also
 Battle of Yongsan
 Changnyeong County

References

External links
 Climate
 Visit Korea
 Official website

Changnyeong County
Towns and townships in South Gyeongsang Province